The 1916 Cork Intermediate Hurling Championship was the eighth staging of the Cork Intermediate Hurling Championship since its establishment by the Cork County Board.

Cobh won the championship following a 5-4 to 0-3 defeat of Mallow in the final.

Results

Final

References

Cork Intermediate Hurling Championship
Cork Intermediate Hurling Championship